is a town located in Onga District, Fukuoka Prefecture, Japan.

As of April 30, 2017, the town has an estimated population of 14,182 and a density of 1,200 persons per km². The total area is 11.42 km².

Ashiya is known for its Japan Air Self-Defence Force base Ashiya Air Field, and the annual sand sculpture festival held on its spacious beach.

References

External links

Ashiya official website 

Towns in Fukuoka Prefecture